Glasgow Monday is the 47th release, third live album, and second-ever double album release, from avant-folk/blues singer/songwriter Jandek.  It is his fifth release of the year (counting the DVD version of Glasgow Sunday) and features "The Corwood Representative" on piano and vocals, along with the same rhythm section he performed with at the shows documented on Glasgow Sunday and Newcastle Sunday, bassist Richard Youngs (playing upright bass) and drummer/percussionist Alex Neilson who accents the music with chimes and echoing percussion.

It was recorded live at the Center for Contemporary Arts in Glasgow, Scotland on May 23, 2005, and features a prelude and nine parts to a single song, "The Cell".

Track listing

"The Cell"

Disc one

Disc two

References

Jandek live albums
2006 live albums